A New Way of Life is a 1942 novel by the British writer Robert Hichens. Like many of his works, it is set in North Africa in the Sahara Desert.

References

Bibliography
 Vinson, James. Twentieth-Century Romance and Gothic Writers. Macmillan, 1982.

1942 British novels
Novels by Robert Hichens 
Hutchinson (publisher) books